John Samuel Rawls (January 1, 1921 – May 11, 1993) was an American politician in the state of Florida. He served in the Florida State Senate from 1955 to 1961 as a Democratic member for the 4th district.

References

1921 births
1993 deaths
Democratic Party Florida state senators
Pork Chop Gang
20th-century American politicians